Alice Ong (born Cho Cho on 8 August 1994) is a Burmese actress, model and beauty pageant title holder of Shan-Chinese descent. She gained popularity after starring in the 2018 film Dimensions which brought her wider recognition.

Early life and education
Alice was born on 8 August 1994 in Taunggyi, Shan State, Myanmar. She was a Shan-Chinese descent. Her father was a Chinese from Guangdong, China, and her mother was a Shan-Chinese descent from Shan State, Myanmar. She is eldest daughter of four siblings, having two younger brothers and one younger sister. She graduated with a "HND diploma" from Victoria University College in 2015 and "BA honors" from University of Wolverhampton in 2018. Alice moved to Yangon from Taunggyi with her mother after her parents divorced.

Pageantry

Modeling and local pageant
Alice started modeling in 2013 and also appeared on magazine cover photos as a model. She competed in the many local beauty pageant contests, and have won Miss Suko 2014, Miss Shwe Kann Tharyar and Miss PH Care and brand and appointed as brand ambassador.

Miss Asia Myanmar 2015
Alice competed in the Miss Asia Myanmar 2015 pageant which was held on 14 November 2015 at Ngwesaung beach, Pathein. At the end of the event, she was elected to represent Myanmar at the Miss Asia 2015 pageant. After previously competing in the Miss Asia Myanmar 2015 pageant, a person who recognized her from Miss Asia Myanmar, and got many requests to act the advertisements.

Acting career

2016–2017: Acting debut
After previously competing in the Miss Asia Myanmar 2015 pageant, she became an actress. Alice made her film debut in 2016 with a leading role in the film Bella and Me, alongside Khar Ra. The film directed by May Barani and film released in May 2017.

2017–present: Breaking into the big screen
Alice took on her first big-screen leading role in the action-thriller film Dimensions alongside Khar Ra, directed by Nyan Htin which premiered in Myanmar cinemas on 9 February 2018 and also screened in Singapore. The film was a domestic hit in Myanmar, and led to increased recognition for Alice Ong.

In 2018, she co-starred with Daung and Angel Lamung in the dance film Wind Up Dancer, directed by Myo Myint Shwe, and written by Nat Khat Ni. It was produced by JATAKA Film Production and premiered in Myanmar cinemas on 9 May 2019.

Brand ambassadorships
Alice was appointed as brand ambassador for Canal+ Myanmar of Cha Tate Channel and  Pu Tu Tue Channel in 2017. She also brand model for Vivo smartphone in 2018.

Filmography

Film (Cinema)

Film

References

External links

1994 births
Living people
Alumni of the University of Wolverhampton
Burmese film actresses
Burmese female models
21st-century Burmese actresses
People from Taunggyi
Burmese people of Chinese descent